Rafael Zarza Gonzalez (born October 1944 in Havana, Cuba) is a Cuban artist specializing in painting, engraving, graphic design and illustration.

Zarza studied drawing and painting from 1959 to 1963 at the Escuela Nacional de Bellas Artes "San Alejandro" in Havana. He was a member of the Taller Experimental de Gráfica (TEG) at the Plaza de la Catedral in Havana from 1965 to 1996. In addition, he was juror in the Salón de Artes Plásticas UNEAC '82 at the Museo Nacional de Bellas Artes de La Habana in Havana.

Individual exhibitions
Among his must relevant exhibitions can be included in 1972 "Grabados y Dibujos" at the Galeria Viva in México as well as Caracas, Venezuela. In 1980, he exhibited "Grabados y Carteles de Rafael Zarza" at the Sala de Exposición, Centro Cultural Arabe, in Damascus, Syria. In 1995, he exhibited his works "Tauropatía. Zarza. Obra Gráfica" at the Galeria Espuela de Plata, Centro de Desarrollo de las Artes Visuales in Havana. In 1998, he presented his works "30 años no son nada" (litografías 1967–1998) at the Galeria del Grabado, Taller Experimental de Gráfica (TEG), in Havana.

References

Written sources
Jose Veigas-Zamora, Cristina Vives Gutierrez, Adolfo V. Nodal, Valia Garzon, Dannys Montes de Oca; Memoria: Cuban Art of the 20th Century; (California/International Arts Foundation 2001); 
Jose Viegas; Memoria: Artes Visuales Cubanas Del Siglo Xx; (California International Arts 2004);   

Cuban contemporary artists
Living people
1944 births